Macrochilo cribrumalis, the dotted fan-foot, is a litter moth of the family Erebidae. The species was first described by Jacob Hübner in 1793. It is found in Europe.

 

The ground colour is whitish fawn and the forewing has two dotted crosslines. The wingspan is 27–30 mm. The length of the forewings is 13–14 mm. The moth flies in one generation from late May to August .

The larvae feed on various species of Cyperaceae such as Carex sylvatica but also grasses and Luzula campestris.

Notes
The flight season refers to Belgium and the Netherlands. This may vary in other parts of the range.

References

"Macrochilo cribrumalis (Hübner, 1793)". Fauna Europaea. Retrieved 28 January 2020.
"08843 Macrochilo cribrumalis (Hübner, 1793) - Sumpfgras-Spannereule". Lepiforum e.V. Retrieved 28 January 2020.
"Stippelsnuituil Macrochilo cribrumalis". De Vlinderstichting. 

Herminiinae
Moths of Europe
Taxa named by Jacob Hübner
Moths described in 1793